Ivan Möller (12 February 1884 – 31 July 1972) was a Swedish sprint runner, hurdler and high jumper. He competed at the 1912 Summer Olympics held in Stockholm in the 100 m, 200 m and 4 × 100 m relay. He won a silver medal in the relay, and failed to reach the final in his individual events.

Nationally Möller won eleven Swedish titles: in the 200 m in 1911, in the 110 m hurdles in 1910–12, in high jump in 1909 (twice), and in the 4 × 100 m relay in 1907 and 1909–1912.

References

1884 births
1972 deaths
Swedish male sprinters
Olympic silver medalists for Sweden
Athletes (track and field) at the 1912 Summer Olympics
Olympic athletes of Sweden
Medalists at the 1912 Summer Olympics
Olympic silver medalists in athletics (track and field)
Athletes from Gothenburg
20th-century Swedish people